María Gabriela Martínez (born 3 January 1983) is a Venezuelan épée fencer.

Career 
She won silver in individual épée at the 2019 Pan American Fencing Championships held in Toronto, Canada and has also represented her country in two Olympics, the 2008 Summer Olympics held in Beijing, China and 2012 Summer Olympics in London, England in women's individual épée.

Personal life 
She is a member of the Church of Jesus Christ of Latter-day Saints.

References 

1983 births
Living people
Venezuelan female épée fencers
Olympic fencers of Venezuela
Fencers at the 2008 Summer Olympics
Fencers at the 2012 Summer Olympics
Venezuelan Latter Day Saints
Fencers at the 2015 Pan American Games
Pan American Games silver medalists for Venezuela
Pan American Games bronze medalists for Venezuela
Pan American Games medalists in fencing
Central American and Caribbean Games gold medalists for Venezuela
Central American and Caribbean Games silver medalists for Venezuela
Central American and Caribbean Games bronze medalists for Venezuela
Competitors at the 2010 Central American and Caribbean Games
Competitors at the 2014 Central American and Caribbean Games
South American Games gold medalists for Venezuela
South American Games silver medalists for Venezuela
South American Games bronze medalists for Venezuela
South American Games medalists in fencing
Competitors at the 2010 South American Games
Competitors at the 2014 South American Games
Central American and Caribbean Games medalists in fencing
Medalists at the 2015 Pan American Games
Medalists at the 2011 Pan American Games
20th-century Venezuelan women
21st-century Venezuelan women